Cossu is an Italian surname. Notable people with the surname include:

Alessio Cossu (born 1986), Italian footballer
Andrea Cossu (disambiguation), multiple people
Antoni Cossu (1927–2002), Italian novelist and poet
Francesco Cossu, Italian rower
Scott Cossu, a new-age pianist
John Christian Cossù Sánchez (born 1992), Uruguayan footballer

Italian-language surnames